John Peter is an Indian film score and soundtrack composer who has predominantly scored music for Tamil films.

Career
Peter worked as a bureaucrat before first working as a musician on Prathi Gnayiru 9 Manimudhal 10.30 Varai (2006), which had a delayed release. He subsequently went on to work closely with Harikumar who gave him the chance to compose the songs for Madurai Sambavam (2009) and Bodinayakanur Ganesan (2011). Similarly, Vadivudaiyan gave him the chance to work on two films, Kanniyum Kaalaiyum Sema Kadhal and Sowkarpettai (2015), which became Peter's most high profile projects. In 2015, he also worked on the Vijay Vasanth-starrer Vanna Jigina, produced by N. Linguswamy.

Discography
Films released in order of album release, regardless of the date of the film's release.

References

Living people
Tamil film score composers
Telugu film score composers
Musicians from Tamil Nadu
Year of birth missing (living people)